The Museum of Monterey - Stanton Center, also known as the Monterey History & Maritime Museum, tells the history of Monterey and the surrounding area through the lens of its connection to the sea. Free to the public, it houses thousands of artifacts. It includes permanent exhibits on the 1935  disaster off Point Sur, the Ohlone and Rumsien tribes that once lived in the area, the Spanish exploration of the California coast and the Monterey sardine industry. It is operated by the Monterey History and Art Association.

History

The museum began in 1971 as the Allen Knight Maritime Museum. It was located in the basement of the Monterey Museum of Art, and principally housed the collection of Allen Knight, who briefly worked as a sailor in 1916, and collected artifacts and memorabilia related to maritime activities throughout his life.

The proposal for a new maritime museum was approved in 1982, but funding was not fully acquired until 1991. On July 15, 1991, construction began on the current Maritime and History Museum in Custom House Plaza. The museum opened on October 31, 1992.

See also
List of maritime museums in the United States

References

External links
 Museum of Monterey

Maritime history of California
Maritime museums in California
Museums in Monterey County, California
History museums in California
Buildings and structures in Monterey, California
Tourist attractions in Monterey, California
Museums established in 1971
1971 establishments in California